Jared W. Anderson (December 28, 1974 – October 14, 2006) was an American death metal musician best known as the bassist and vocalist of Morbid Angel from 2001 to 2002 and Hate Eternal from 1998 to 2003.

Jared Anderson formed his first band, Internecine, in December, 1997 at the age of 22, and saw his six-year career interrupted in 2003 when he was forced to leave Hate Eternal as a result of struggles with substance abuse. He co-wrote all of the songs for Internecine with Shannon Purdon and released two demos, one in 1993 and another in 1997. The Book of Lambs was released in 2001.

Jared Anderson died in his sleep of an unspecified cause in 2006. Shortly before his death, he had started a new project called As One... with Steve Tucker, also a former member of Morbid Angel. His last recording was a guest appearance in The Allknowing's cover of Motörhead's "Ace of Spades" which, since 2007, has been freely accessible online.

The 2008 Hate Eternal album, Fury & Flames, was dedicated to Jared Anderson's memory.

Discography
1999 - Hate Eternal - Conquering the Throne (bass, vocals)
2001 - Internecine - The Book of Lambs (bass, guitars, vocals)
2002 - Hate Eternal - King of All Kings (bass, vocals)

References

External links
Comment about Anderson's death by Steeve Hurdle, 2006-10-17
Comment about Anderson's death by Erik Rutan, 2006-10-18
Comment about Anderson's death by Earache Records, 2006-10-20
Comment about Anderson's death by Steve Tucker, 2006-10-22

1974 births
2006 deaths
American heavy metal bass guitarists
American heavy metal singers
Death metal musicians
Morbid Angel members
People from Covington, Kentucky
Place of birth missing
20th-century American singers
Rock musicians from Kentucky
Singers from Kentucky
Guitarists from Kentucky
American male bass guitarists
Hate Eternal members
20th-century American bass guitarists
21st-century American bass guitarists
20th-century American male singers
21st-century American male musicians